Narayanganj  Railway Junction   is a station in Narayanganj District, Bangladesh. The station is the main & populated station of Narayanganj city.

Narayanganj Railway Junction was the famous railway station in the British and Pakistan period also still now. This is oldest railway station in the region. The station was most important terminal specially jute trading meant Adamjee Jute Mills and other communication routes abreast ferry terminal along with bus terminal. Now everyday around more than thirty thousand passengers travel to the capital from Narayanganj by train.

History 
Narayanganj Railway Junction is situated on the western bank of Shitalakshya River at the point where the Brahmaputra and Buriganga discharged into the Shitalakshya.

In December 1882, the Government of Bengal began work on the Dacca State Railway, connecting Dacca with Narayanganj, its satellite river port to the south, and with Mymensingh to the north. Revenue service on the  Dacca-Narayanganj segment began on 4 January 1885. The  Mymensingh-Dhaka segment opened for cargo on 1 August 1885, and thereafter opened for passengers gradually in sections through 18 February 1886. At completion, rolling stock consisted of 12 engines, 60 passenger coaches, and 345 freight wagons. The line was used mainly to transport jute to the port of Narayanganj, from which it was shipped by river to Calcutta.

Present condition 

Everyday except Friday there are sixteen trains departure from Narayanganj  And sixteen trains arrival from Dhaka in this Junction and they run from early morning at 6.25 AM to 11.15 PM. At Friday six trains up and down between Narayanganj and Dhaka from morning to evening.

See also
 Narayanganj-Bahadurabad Ghat Line

References

External links 
 Official website Of Bangladesh Railway 

Railway stations in Narayanganj District
Railway stations opened in 1885
1885 establishments in British India